Physoderma is a genus of chytrid fungi. Described by German botanist Karl Friedrich Wilhelm Wallroth in 1833, the genus contains some species that are parasitic on vascular plants, including P. alfalfae and P. maydis, causative agents of crown wart of alfalfa and brown spot of corn, respectively. Of the chytrid genera, Physoderma is the oldest. However, species were confused with the rust fungi, the genus Synchytrium, and the genus Protomyces of Ascomycota. Members of Physoderma are obligate parasites of pteridophytes and angiosperms. There are approximately 80 species within this genus (depending on whether one includes those traditionally belonging to Urophlyctis).

Taxonomic history
The genus was erected in 1833 on the basis of resting spore development  and included 6 species. Unfortunately, his original diagnosis was very similar to that of Protomyces, which led others to place species in the wrong genus. In 1877, Nowakowski erected the genus Cladochytrium in the Chytridiales, which led to the transfer of Physoderma to the Chytridiales as well  by Schroeter in 1883. Just prior to that (1882), Schroeter added an additional 4 species to the genus and noted, for the first time, epibiotic, ephemeral zoosporangia. He also claimed that sexual reproduction was through the fusion of two cells and resulted in the resting spores. In 1889, Schroeter created the genus Urophlyctis for those species with epibiotic, ephemeral zoosporangia and sexually derived resting spores. He placed both in the same subfamily as Cladochytrium. In 1891, Fischer refuted Schroeter's observations on sexual reproduction and merged Physoderma and Urophlyctis with Cladochytrium. In 1897, Schroeter separated them once more. Magnus, in 1901, used characteristics of the resting spore and host plant reaction to distinguish between Physoderma and Urophlyctis. He claimed that resting spores from Physoderma were globose and ellipsoidal, and those from Urophlyctis were flattened on one side. Physoderma species cause discoloration and slight malformation, while Urophlycits cause significant malformation and hypertrophy. Sparrow, in numerous publications, expressed concerns over the characters used to distinguish the two genera. In 1943, Sparrow suggested that the genus be merged with Urophlyctis, which was done by Karling in 1950. He also moved Physoderma to its own family, the Physodermataceae. Sparrow, in 1962, decided the genera were distinct based on morphology and host reaction. However, at this time, the two genera are considered synonymous. Typically, it was thought that Physoderma was related to the polycentric genera Cladochytrium and Nowakowskiella Based on the ultrastructure of the zoospore, it was realized that Physoderma belongs to the Blastocladiales, which later became the Blastocladiomycota. Recent phylogenetic analyses indicate that Physoderma and Urophlycits might be separate genera.

Morphology & life cycle
Physoderma species are characterized as having a both a monocentric thallus and an endobiotic polycentric thallus. Resting spores germinate in the spring to produce zoospores that will infect the host. The initial infection gives rise to monocentric, epibiotic zoosporangium anchored with endobiotic rhizoids confined to a single host cell. The zoosporangium has been characterized as Rhizidium or Phlyctochytrium like; it usually has discharge papilla through which the zoospores are released. (Physoderma is considered operculate, though some species once in Urophlyctis appear to be inoperculate.) The liberated zoospores infect new host cells, and in this fashion, an infection can go through several generations. As well, the sporangia are internally proliferous; that is, they can produce a second round of zoospores after releasing the first one. In late spring and summer, the zoospores will begin to develop into an endobiotic polycentric thallus. This thallus is often extensive, infecting many host cells, with highly branched, fine rhizoids. These rhizoids can bear intercalary cells, which many be once or twice septate (and what Schroeter saw as evidence of sexual reproduction). The endobiotic thallus gives rise to large, thick-walled, dark-colored resting spores that take the shape of the host cell. It appears the resting spores are formed from the intercalary cells. These resting spores will over winter and germinate in the spring.

Ecology
Many species of Physoderma infect marsh plants, and several are confined to the submerged portion of hosts. Infections are usually confined to the leaves and stems, or, less commonly, the petioles of the host plants; however, there are some species that also or specifically infect parts of the flower. A notable example is Physoderma deformans; it infects the flower of two species of Anemone. A curious side effect, flowers infected with P. deformans live longer than non-infected flowers. There is at least one known species that infects the roots of the host plant rather than the above-ground parts. Infections can cause discoloration, warts, or galls. Physoderma species can be highly specific in both host choice and area of infection. An example is P. dulichii, which only infects the upper epidermal cells on young leaves of Dulichium arundinaceum. Another example are two species that infect Sium suave: one infects only the submerged portion of the plant, the other only infects the emergent portion of the plant, but they can be found growing on the same plant. Due to their reliance on zoospores, Physoderma species require free water. As an example, P. dulichii requires at least an inch of standing water to initiate the infection of a host plant. Once the plant is infected, however, high humidity, dew, or rain is sufficient to keep the infection going through the growing season.

Species

Physoderma aeschynomenes
Physoderma alfalfae
Physoderma alpinum
Physoderma aneilematis
Physoderma aponogetonicola
Physoderma aponogetonis
Physoderma asphodeli
Physoderma astomatis
Physoderma australasicum
Physoderma beckmanniae
Physoderma bohemicum
Physoderma bothriochloae
Physoderma brachiariae
Physoderma brachiariae-eruciformis
Physoderma chrysopogonicola
Physoderma citri
Physoderma claytoniana
Physoderma claytonianum
Physoderma comari
Physoderma commelinae
Physoderma corchori
Physoderma crepidis
Physoderma cynodontis
Physoderma debeauxii
Physoderma dichanthiicola
Physoderma dicksonii
Physoderma digitariae
Physoderma dulichii
Physoderma echinochloae
Physoderma eleocharidis
Physoderma eragrostidis
Physoderma eriochloae
Physoderma fabae
Physoderma gerhardtii
Physoderma graminis
Physoderma hemisphaericum
Physoderma hydrocotylidis
Physoderma indicum
Physoderma johnsii
Physoderma kriegeriana
Physoderma kyllingae
Physoderma lathyri
Physoderma leproides
Physoderma limnanthemi
Physoderma lycopi
Physoderma maculare
Physoderma marsileae
Physoderma maydis
Physoderma meliloti
Physoderma menyanthis
Physoderma mouretii
Physoderma myriophylli
Physoderma narasimhanii
Physoderma negeri
Physoderma nelumbii
Physoderma notosciadii
Physoderma ornithogali
Physoderma palustre
Physoderma pancratii
Physoderma paspali
Physoderma paspalidii
Physoderma pluriannulatum
Physoderma potteri
Physoderma pulposum
Physoderma rayssiae
Physoderma ruebsaamenii
Physoderma schroeteri
Physoderma scirpicola
Physoderma setariicola
Physoderma sparrovii
Physoderma thirumalacharii
Physoderma trachoniticum
Physoderma trifolii
Physoderma vagabundum
Physoderma vagans

References

External links

Blastocladiomycota
Taxa named by Karl Friedrich Wilhelm Wallroth
Taxa described in 1883